S. reticulata  may refer to:
 Salix reticulata, the net-leaved willow, a dwarf willow species occurring in the colder parts of Northern Europe, Greenland, North America and Northern Asia
 Scenella reticulata, an extinct mollusc species from the Early Cambrian–Middle Ordovician
 Schistura reticulata, a ray-finned fish species 
 Senna reticulata, the mangerioba grande or maria mole, a plant species found in South America
 Sideridis reticulata, the bordered gothic, a moth species found in the Palearctic ecozone
 Stephania reticulata, a flowering plant species native to eastern and southern Asia and Australasia
 Syringa reticulata, the Japanese tree lilac, a plant species native to eastern Asia

See also